The Noble M600 is a handbuilt British sports car manufactured by low volume automobile manufacturer Noble Automotive in Leicestershire. Construction of the car is of stainless steel and carbon fibre. The car uses a twin-turbocharged Volvo/Yamaha V8 engine.

Model information

General

The M600 comes in three specifications,  the standard; which uses a fibre glass body; the carbon sport which uses a carbon-fibre body and the Speedster which is basically a targa top version. The M600 is hand-built by a team of 20 workers at the company's Leicestershire facility. The M600 uses a steel backbone and aluminium chassis which is the same chassis used on the stillborn M15.

Engine and transmission
The M600 uses a  Yamaha-built Volvo B8444S 60º V8 engine which is also used in the Volvo XC90 and S80. The engine used in the M600 is manufactured by Motorkraft in the US from B8444S crate engines with Garrett AiResearch twin-turbochargers equipped with variable boost. The engine also features a MoTeC M190 and Injector Dynamics ID725 electronic fuel injection. It has a compression ratio of 9.50:1. It uses an Oerlikon Graziano transaxle six-speed manual gearbox and has the redline set at 7,000 rpm. At least, a pre-production variant of the Speedster is also equipped with an automatic gearbox.

Brakes
The M600 uses steel brake discs with six piston calipers at the front and four piston calipers at the rear. The brakes are designed by Britain-based braking specialist Alcon. Owing to the driver focused nature of the car, there is no Anti-lock Braking System installed and the brakes have limited servo assistance.

Interior
The interior of the car has twin hide upholstery and gloss carbon-fibre trim as standard. Buyers have the choice to choose from leather, suede an advantage upholstery along with knurled wood trim and wool carpeting. The switches and instrumentation are bespoke to the M600, although some components are shared with Jaguar and Aston Martin models. The car is equipped with an adjustable steering column and driver's seat while the pedals are offset to the left. The pedals are adjusted according to the owner's preference in order to provide a good driving position. A highlight of the interior is the engine power control knob, similar to Ferrari's Manettino dial, which allows the driver to choose from variable engine power outputs along with related turbo boost pressure (Road, Track and Race). The knob is present ahead of the gearshift knob on the dashboard. A traction control switch activates the limited traction control which is present to avoid oversteer. The interior is based on simplicity and is driver focused, inspired by the Ferrari F40 and due to this, it does away with climate control and modern infotainment systems.

Performance
0–: 3.0 seconds
0–: 8.9 seconds
0–: 29.8 seconds
Standing 1/4 mile: 10.9 seconds
Standing km: 19.9 seconds
Power-to-weight ratio: 558 hp/tonne
Top speed:  - estimated /  - proven
Fuel capacity:

Reception
The car was driven two times on the British motoring show Top Gear. First in Series 14, Episode 5 by Jeremy Clarkson, who praised the car considerably and the show's racing driver the Stig took it around the Top Gear track and it did a 1:17.7 on a cold day, beating the Pagani Zonda F Roadster and the Bugatti Veyron. In Series 18, Episode 1 co-host Richard Hammond drove a left-hand drive version of the car through Italy and the clutch failed, causing clutch material to damage the gearbox; Noble sent the production team another car. Later in the same episode Hammond drove it during a challenge where he attempted to beat a laptime set by the Stig at the Autodromo Enzo e Dino Ferrari on the outskirts of Imola. Despite the breakdown, Hammond heaped considerable praise on the car. It has also been featured in the American adaptation of the show where it receives considerable praise, the main "challenge" was to reach its top speed, the vehicle reached , but stopped because the vehicle ran out of space on the runway it was being tested on.

References

External links 

2010 Noble M600 Breaks Cover
BREAKING: Noble unleashes 225 mph M600 supercar
Noble M600: 650 HP, 225 MPH Driving Excitement
Top Gear Review: 
E-brochure: 
M600 Roadster/convertible - official factory design study revealed

M600
Sports cars
Rear mid-engine, rear-wheel-drive vehicles
Cars introduced in 2010